Kurt Hillenbrand (born 16 September 1957) is a German sports shooter. He competed at the 1984 Summer Olympics and the 1988 Summer Olympics.

References

External links
 

1957 births
Living people
German male sport shooters
Olympic shooters of West Germany
Shooters at the 1984 Summer Olympics
Shooters at the 1988 Summer Olympics
People from Karlsruhe (district)
Sportspeople from Karlsruhe (region)